Nicholas John F. Murphy (22 October 1966 – 1 September 1998) was an English professional footballer who played as a defender in the Football League for York City, and in non-League football for Tadcaster Albion and Magnets.

Career 
Born in Tadcaster, Murphy started his career with York City's youth system in 1983 on a Youth Training Scheme. He signed a professional contract with the club in July 1984. With John MacPhail being rested, Murphy made his first team debut on 29 January 1986 in an Associate Members' Cup game at home to Hartlepool United. He was substituted for Stuart McKenzie during the game, which York went on to lose 3–2. Murphy did not make any league appearances for York before leaving the club in May 1986. He went on to play in non-League football for Tadcaster Albion and Magnets.

Death 
Murphy died aged 31 in a car crash involving three vehicles on the A659 at Newton Kyme, North Yorkshire on 1 September 1998.

Career statistics

References 

1966 births
People from Tadcaster
Footballers from Yorkshire
1998 deaths
English footballers
Association football defenders
York City F.C. players
Tadcaster Albion A.F.C. players
Road incident deaths in England